Corinthia Hotel Prague,  also called Corinthia Towers (original name Hotel Fórum), is highrise luxury hotel in Prague's Nusle District, next to the Prague Congress Centre and Vyšehrad Metro station. It was built in 1988. It contains 26 floors (two underground), 539 rooms, a 14-metre-long pool, a wellness center, several restaurants and congress halls.

References

External links 
 Official website

Skyscrapers in Prague
Hotels in Prague
Hotel buildings completed in 1988
Skyscraper hotels
1988 establishments in Czechoslovakia
20th-century architecture in the Czech Republic